Rubi is a 2010 Philippine romantic-drama television series and is an adaptation of Televisa's 2004 TV series of the same name created by Yolanda Vargas Dulché and directed by Erick C. Salud, Don M. Cuaresma, Manny Q. Palo and Darnel Joy R. Villaflor. The series stars Angelica Panganiban on her title role as Rubi Perez-Ferrer and Theresa Rodrigo-dela Fuente, and ABS-CBN's Kapamilya Gold Queen Shaina Magdayao as Maribel dela Fuente-Cardenas, together with leading men Jake Cuenca and Diether Ocampo, with an ensemble cast consisting of Cherry Pie Picache, Cherie Gil, Gardo Versoza, Allan Paule, Kaye Abad, Susan Africa, Wowie de Guzman, Coney Reyes, Juan Rodrigo, Dante Rivero, Bing Loyzaga, Rey "PJ" Abellana, Megan Young, and Mel Martinez. The series premiered on ABS-CBN's Primetime Bida evening block from February 15 to August 13, 2010, replacing Pinoy Big Brother: Double Up and was replaced by Precious Hearts Romances presents: Martha Cecilia's Kristine.

The main difference of this teleserye to others is that the lead character, Rubi, is an anti-hero dubbed as "Ang Bidang-Kontrabida" (The Villainous Protagonist). She is vain, scheming and manipulative but still has heart, but chose not to listen to her conscience to reach her high ambitions.

Plot

Beginning
Vivian (Cherry Pie Picache) gives birth to her daughter while she's still in prison because of fraud charges, thus, leaving her no other choice but to put her newly born daughter for adoption. Immediately after her release, she goes in search for the child. And to her surprise, she learns that her daughter is actually under the care of the child's biological father, Arturo (Gardo Versoza) and his new wife Sylvanna (Cherie Gil). Insistent to get her daughter back, Vivian relentlessly kidnaps her. And in line with her plan of starting a new life, she brings her daughter far away to the city and she changes their names. Vivian is now Rosanna and her daughter is named Rubi (Xyriel Manabat). Vivian's possessive lover Danilo (Alan Paule) located them. She conned him while inside prison to help her with her parole. After getting her parole, she escapes from him, leaving him looking like an idiot. He now wants to take revenge on Rosanna and her family. Rubi (Khaycee Aboloc) escapes but became lost in the city. In order to survive, she knocks on car windows to ask for alms. For months, she spent time alone in the busy streets. But fortunately, her time alone is immediately cut short by her unexpected reunion with her mother who has been searching for her all those times. On the other hand, since Sylvanna is still longing for their lost daughter, which is now Rubi, she then decides to adopt a child named Maribel (Shaina Magdayao). But unfortunately for the poor child, she encounters a terrible car accident while driving with her foster father, thus, marking a permanent damage on her left leg.

Years pass
Though they lack the cash, Rubi (Angelica Panganiban) all grown up continuously lives in luxury. Apparently, her mother insistently spoils her with extravagance to make up for their uncalled for separation before. Rubi grew up to become a beautiful young woman and she is not afraid to flaunt her looks. She has an ambition of marrying a wealthy man to get out of the slums that they live in and for her to finally afford all her luxuries. Even though she knows that she couldn't practically afford it, Rosanna strives hard to send Rubi in a prestigious private school. On their way to inquire about admissions, Rubi accidentally comes across Maribel. She learns that Maribel has an inferiority complex because of her disability and upon realizing that the young lady is filthy rich, Rubi instantly decides to befriend the disabled young lady and defends her from her bullies. Maribel invites Rubi over to her house so that she could meet her parents. And immediately, the charming young lady gains the couple's favor. And since she had finally earned Maribel's trust, Rubi gets a peep in her new friend's life. Maribel gladly introduces Hector (Diether Ocampo), her long-time chat-mate, to her. Aside from that, the young lady also discloses the fact that she is in fact an adopted daughter. Through Maribel and her family, Rubi gets a taste of the good life. Maribel showers her with nice clothes, shoes, gadgets. While Rubi case for Maribel, she also harbors deep envy of her social status. Her envy went deeper when she discovered that she is the real daughter of Arturo and not Maribel. She thinks that Maribel's life should have been hers.

Things become more complicated
Maribel tells Rubi that her long time chat mate, Hector will be coming for them to meet face to face. Since Maribel is shy about meeting Hector, Rubi sets Maribel up on a date with Hector and Hector and Maribel immediately fell in love despite her disability. Hector introduces his best friend Alejandro who soon falls in love with Rubi. After thinking Alejandro was rich, Rubi flirts with him and as time passes, she develops feelings for him but when she discovered that Alejandro is not rich and is only a scholar by Hector's family, she slowly became cold to Alejandro. However, she could not deny that she was in love with him, and finally accepted it. When Sylvanna and Arturo learned that Rubi was their long-lost adopted child, they asked her to live with them. Rubi now reached her goals of living luxury as Maribel's sister, but longed for her mother Rosanna. After a misunderstanding caused a fight between Maribel and Rubi, they all realized that Rubi was better off living back with Rosanna. Sylvanna and Arturo offered her allowance as a support, but Rubi demanded more, which escalated into a fight that ended with Rubi being in jail. This cemented Rubi's vow to take revenge and take Maribel's life which she believed should be hers. Hurtfully forcing herself to forget Alejandro, she seduced Hector behind her best friend's back. The night before Hector and Maribel's wedding, Rubi gave herself to Hector. Hector completely lost judgment and chose Rubi instead of his fiancé. He then abandons Maribel at their wedding and marries Rubi instead. Upon realizing the truth, Alejandro and Hector's friendship was completely broken because they realized they are in love with one woman. Alejandro and Maribel felt betrayed by the actions of their best friends. Chaos also ensued at the families of Hector and Maribel because of what they have done. Danilo also revealed her mother's and Arturo's relationship which destroyed Maribel's family. Sylvanna was furious at Rubi but Rubi now has the wealth to use against her. Rubi, however, lost her right to Arturo's wealth since Sylvanna cut off Arturo. In the midst of the chaos, Alejandro and Maribel were left with each other. As time passed by, they slowly  became attracted with each other. Alejandro, who fell in love with Maribel, still harbors feelings for Rubi. On the other hand, Rubi realizes that she is not completely happy with being rich. She hates the fact that Alejandro is dating Maribel and wants him for herself. Hector becomes insecure about his wife especially when she's with Alejandro during social and charity functions which she uses to flirt with him, which exposes Hector's violent side. Rubi continues her scheming to get more money from Hector's family since she knows her husband is blindly in love with her and knows nothing about her secret plans. Her in-laws try to expose her but she always one step ahead of them. Rubi blackmailed her father-in-law about his affair with another woman with whom he also has a family. She accidentally reveals it later and causes a rift between Hector's parents. One of her plans against Maribel's family backfired on her and it killed her mother. Instead of changing her ways because of the tragedy, Rubi is more determined than ever to get all that she wants. She framed Sylvanna for the tragedy and sent her to prison. She is also starting showing her true colors to her husband. She made a fashion business with her cohort, Loretto just to destroy Maribel's business even though she has no knowledge of how to run a business. She also caused some trouble to her sister's boyfriend Cayetano. She doesn't want him for her sister because he is just a family driver of Maribel's family. She openly criticizes and mocks him and even tried to put him in jail by framing him up with theft. Luckily, she did not succeed and Cayetano was sent free but it caused a rift between Rubi and her sister, Cristina. While Maribel is still dating Alejandro, she catches Rubi and Alejandro kissing. Maribel is devastated while Rubi is delighted by thinking Alejandro still loves her. Alejandro is torn between Maribel and Rubi. Alejandro and Rubi meet one night and they became intimate with each other. Maribel discovers this and decided to go away. Rubi soon becomes pregnant and questions the possibility that it could be Alejandro's baby instead of Hector's. Still unsure, Rubi tells Hector that the baby is his. Meanwhile, Alejandro goes to Maribel's house hoping that Maribel will forgive him, where he finds out that Maribel has left for Europe but still she came back because her love for Alejandro is stronger and she is willing to forgive him. Also, she doesn't want Rubi to see that she is affected of what happened. Rubi remembers her mother's parting words and realizes she should change her ways. She asks forgiveness from Maribel and they make up. She is also starting to be happy, excited for her baby. However, Hector finds the evidence of the one night Rubi and Alejandro made love and confronts Rubi upon her return home. They get into a heated argument and Hector punches her pregnant stomach and she had a miscarriage. After some tests, it was revealed that Hector killed his own baby. Because of these incidents, Hector completely lost his mind.

Finale
After she recovered, Rubi tried to get back to Hector to talk to him and explain her version of the story. Little did she know that Hector was now deranged. Hector takes Rubi to their unfinished, would-be home still under construction and physically abuses her. Hector then calls Alejandro and pretends that he has become nice, but it was an act so he could kill him. Rubi tries to stop Hector but he accidentally pushes Rubi off the edge of the building. Rubi holds on for dear life while Alejandro arrives. Hector tries to save her but stumbles and falls to his death landing on the pavement below while Rubi falls down with him into the glass near the construction and is rushed to the hospital afterwards. She now realizes that she already had everything; her family, friends, the man that truly loved her, but she deemed it all worthless just for her blind ambitions. Rubi wakes up with a huge scar on her face and her right leg has been amputated. Because of a rare skin condition, the scar would not heal and it would remain permanent. The beauty she uses to deceive everyone is now gone. She also agrees to Maribel and Alejandro's marriage and stays friends with them, and lives with her aunt and her niece. Learning her lesson, she visits her mother's grave and tells her that even though she lost everything, she now realizes she is free from her greed and envy and can finally start being happy.

Cast and characters

Main cast
 Angelica Panganiban as Rubi Perez-Ferrer / Theresa Rodrigo-Dela Fuente 
 Jake Cuenca as Alejandro Cardenas 
 Shaina Magdayao as Maribel dela Fuente-Cardenas 
 Diether Ocampo as Hector Ferrer†

Supporting cast
 Cherry Pie Picache as Vivian Rodrigo / Rosanna "Rose" Perez† – Rubi's mother
 Cherie Gil as Sylvana Velasco-dela Fuente – Arturo's wife.
 Gardo Versoza as Arturo dela Fuente – Rubi's father.
 Allan Paule as Danilo Capili – a patrol officer
 Kaye Abad as Princess Rodrigo / Cristina Perez – Rosanna's younger sister and Rubi's aunt.
 Susan Africa as Yaya Pancha – trusted friend and the housekeeper of the Dela Fuente family.
 Wowie De Guzman as Cayetano  – the Dela Fuente family's driver.
 Coney Reyes as Elisa Bermudez-Ferrer – Hector's mother.
 Juan Rodrigo as Genaro Ferrer – Hector's father.
 Dante Rivero as Dr. Jose Bermudez – Hector's uncle who's a neurosurgeon.
 Bing Loyzaga as Carla Cardenas – Alejandro's mother.
 Rey "PJ" Abellana as Ignacio Cardenas – Alejandro's father
 Megan Young as Sophia Cardenas – Alejandro's younger sister.
 Mel Martinez as Lorreto Valiente – Rubi's fashion design teacher, and best friend.

Extended cast
 Eva Darren as Mameng – a storekeeper in Rubi's neighborhood
 Marvin Yap as Bibo – a vagrant in Rubi's neighborhood.
 Xian Lim as Luis N. Ferrer/Luis G. Navarro – Sophia's boyfriend and is Hector's half-brother with his father's mistress.
 Melissa Mendez as Elena Navarro – a woman Hector's father is having an affair with.
 James Blanco as Marco – another medical doctor intern and is Alejandro's friend who courrts Christina.
 Janus Del Prado as Wayne – Rubi's friend
 Irish Fullerton as Nicole – Maribel's schoolmate who bullies her.
 Regine Angeles as Lorena – Nicole's friend who also bullies Maribel but befriends her later on.
 Arlene Tolibas as Hilda Marquez – Genaro's friend.
 Mark Africa as Gabriel – Hector's evil co-worker.
 Angel Sy as Nathalie N. Ferrer – Luis' little sister and Genaro's daughter.
 Jon Avila as Saul – the school's most famous varsity basketball player who gets attracted to Rubi and is Nicole's crush.
 Jake Ocampo as Stu – a male model.
 Ryan Ramos as Toni – a doctor.

Guest cast
Xyriel Manabat as Rubi/Theresa (5 years old)
Daniella Amable as Rubi (8 years old)
KC Aboloc as Young Princess/Cristina

Production

Adaptation

Rubí is a Mexican telenovela that aired on Televisa in 2004, starring actress Bárbara Mori in the title role, Eduardo Santamarina as Alejandro, Jacqueline Bracamontes as Maribel and Sebastián Rulli as Hector. The series had a total of 115 episodes. The original telenovela was aired on ABS-CBN in January, the 1st quarter of 2005 before noontime replacing Gata Salvaje and dubbed in Tagalog until it ended in December, the last quarter of the year. The original series returned in 2015, ten years since the airing of Rubí in the Philippines, this time through Telenovela Channel in English audio.

Casting
Kristine Hermosa and Angelika Dela Cruz were rumoured to be cast as the title character Rubí, but the role eventually went to Angelica Panganiban.

Launch
Rubi  was launched as one of the ABS-CBN's offerings for the 60th Celebration of Filipino Soap Opera ("Ika-60 taon ng Pinoy Soap Opera") during the ABS-CBN Trade Launch for the first quarter of 2010, entitled "Bagong Simula" (New Beginning).

Soundtrack
The theme song of the original Rubí series is used for the Philippine adaptation, "La Descarada" (lit: "The Shameless One"), performed by Reyli.  The song was not translated into a Filipino version and was covered by Anton Alvarez.

In the series Rubi, Rubi and Alejandro's theme song is called "Di Lang Ikaw" (lit: "Not Only You"), performed by Juris Fernandez. It is not translated into an English version.

Reception
Rubi was a hit series throughout its run. According to Kantar Media, its finale episode scored an impressive ratings of 27.8% in nationwide.

See also
List of programs broadcast by ABS-CBN
List of telenovelas of ABS-CBN
Rubí
List of programs aired by Jeepney TV

References

External links
Official Website

ABS-CBN drama series
Television series by Dreamscape Entertainment Television
2010 Philippine television series debuts
2010 Philippine television series endings
Philippine romance television series
Philippine television series based on telenovelas
Philippine television series based on Mexican television series
Filipino-language television shows
Television shows set in the Philippines